West of the West is an album by American artist Dave Alvin, released in 2006. The album pays tribute to California songwriters. It reached number 35 on the Top Independent Albums chart.

Reception

Writing for Allmusic, music critic Mark Deming wrote of the album "While in many respects Alvin is still best described as a songwriter who sings, he knows how to tell a story, and he's picked some great ones for this album." Dan MacIntosh of PopMatters wrote "Downsides are difficult to find with this new work, because Alvin performs each and every track with an obvious appreciation for the artists who wrote them."

Track listing
"California Bloodlines" (John Stewart) – 4:27
"Redneck Friend" (Jackson Browne) – 5:04
"Kern River" (Merle Haggard) – 4:07
"Blind Love" (Tom Waits) – 4:49
"Here in California" (Kate Wolf) – 4:35
"I Am Bewildered" (Richard Berry) – 3:44
"Sonora's Death Row" (Kevin Blackie Farrell) – 5:35
"Down on the Riverbed" (David Hidalgo, Louie Pérez) – 4:12
"Between the Cracks" (Dave Alvin, Tom Russell) – 4:24
"Don't Look Now" (John Fogerty) – 4:02
"Tramps and Hawkers" (Jim Ringer) – 4:35
"Loser" (Jerry Garcia, Robert Hunter) – 4:52
"Surfer Girl" (Brian Wilson) – 3:01
"Boss" (Jack Wenzel) - 2:46 (2LP bonus track)

Personnel
Dave Alvin – vocals, guitar, National Steel guitar
Chris Gaffney – background vocals
Bob Glaub – bass
Don Heffington – drums, percussion
Bobby Lloyd Hicks – drums
Gregory Boaz – bass, double bass
Greg Leisz – guitar, slide guitar, baritone guitar, pedal steel guitar, mandolin, lap slide guitar, background vocals
Danny Barnes – Banjo
Kevin Carroll – background vocals
James Corbitt – background vocals
Herman Pruitt – background vocals
Jesus "El Gordo" Cuevas – accordion
Christy McWilson – vocals
Chris Montez Miller – guitar, slide guitar
Jack Rudy – harmonica
Joe Terry – organ
David Witham – organ
Gabe Witcher – violin

Production notes
Greg Leisz – producer
Craig Adams – engineer
Bill Dashiell – engineer
Jim Scott – mixing
Beau Fletcher – mixing assistant
Steven Rhodes – mixing assistant
Joe Gastwirt – mastering
Lou Beach – design
Deone Jahnke – photography
Issa Sharp – photography

References

2006 albums
Dave Alvin albums
Yep Roc Records albums